Edgar Stepanyan (born 1 January 1997) is an Armenian track cyclist and an International Master of sports.

Career
He became the first Armenian to win a European cycling championship when he won the scratch race at the 2015 UEC European Junior Track Championships. Four days later, he won the silver medal in the points race at the UCI Junior Track World Championships.

Major results
2014
 3rd  Points race, UCI Junior Track World Championships
2015
 1st  Scratch, UEC European Junior Track Championships
 2nd  Points race, UCI Junior Track World Championships
2017
 2017–18 UCI World Cup
2nd  Scratch – Pruszków
2018
 1st  Points race, UEC European Under–23 Track Championships

Awards
 Armenian Best Athlete (2018)
 Top 10 Armenian Best Athlete (2017)
 Dana Point Grand prix  (pro 1.2.3), Gold (2018) United States CA
 Cbr Dominguez Hills Crit Gold (2018) United States CA
 Trofeu International De Anadia Silver (2017) Portugal Anadia
 Armenian Championships Gold (2014 - 2019)

References

External links

1997 births
Living people
Armenian male cyclists
Armenian track cyclists
Cyclists at the 2019 European Games
European Games competitors for Armenia